This is a list of universities in Kurdistan Region

Public universities
University of Duhok, Duhok
Hawler Medical University, Erbil 
University of Koya, Koya
Charmo University, Chamchamal 
University of Raparin, Ranya
University of Salahaddin, Erbil
Soran University, Soran
University of Sulaimani, Suliemani
Sulaimani Polytechnic University SPU, Sulaimani
University of Zakho, Zakho
Duhok Polytechnic University DPU, Duhok
Erbil Polytechnic University, Erbil
University of Halabja, Halabja
University of Garmian, Kalar
University of Kurdistan Hewlêr, Erbil

Private universities
American University of Iraq, Sulaimani, Sulaimani
Catholic University in erbil, Erbil
Qaiwan International University - UTM Franchise, Sulaimani
Kurdistan Technical Institute, Sulaimani
Komar University of Science and Technology, Sulaimani
American University Duhok Kurdistan, Duhok
Cihan University, Erbil
Dijlah College, Erbil
Ishik University, Erbil
Ishik University, Sulaimani
Cihan University, Sulaimani
BMU Lebanese French University, Erbil

British Royal University for Science and Technology, Erbil — the Ministry of Higher Education is disputing its name, and so degrees as of April 16, 2011, were illegal according to Ministry of High Education until the issue is resolved.
زانکۆی ئەربیل / International University of Erbil, Newroz road (double side facing Erbil West Hospital), Erbil
University of Human Development, Sulaimani
Nawroz University, Dohuk
Knowledge University, Erbil

 
Iraq education-related lists
Kurdistan Region

 *